Darío Brizuela Arrieta (born 8 November 1994) is a Spanish professional basketball player for Unicaja of the Liga ACB. He also represents the Spain national team.

Career
Dario Brizuela was trained in the young teams of Easo. In 2011, he was signed by Estudiantes, where he played in the junior team and also played 13 games with the reserve team in Liga EBA.

Brizuela made his debut in Liga ACB in the round 32 of the 2012–13 season, where his club lost by a score of 93–82 against Real Madrid.

In August 2014, he was loaned to Peñas Huesca, of the LEB Oro. After the 2014–15 season, his loan finished and he returned to Estudiantes.

Spain national team
Brizuela won the silver medal at the 2014 FIBA U20 European Championship. He has also played at the 2010 FIBA U16 European Championship and the 2013 FIBA Under-19 World Cup.

His official match debut with the Spain national team was on 1 July 2018 against Belarus in a 2019 FIBA World Cup qualifier.

Awards and accomplishments

Spain national team
 2014 FIBA U20 European Championship:

External links
Profile on ACB.com
Profile at FEB.es
Profile at seleccionbalencesto.es
Profile at fibaeurope.com
Profile on clubestudiantes.com

References 

1994 births
Living people
Baloncesto Málaga players
Basketball players from the Basque Country (autonomous community)
CB Estudiantes players
CB Peñas Huesca players
Liga ACB players
Shooting guards
Spanish men's basketball players
Sportspeople from San Sebastián